Akshay Dogra (born 21 September 1981) is an Indian actor and producer working in the television industry. He has worked on many shows during his career, both on-screen and off-screen. After working backstage at many shows, Akshay finally made his television debut in 12/24 Karol Bagh on Zee TV. He is known for playing Akash Manohar Singh Raizada in Iss Pyaar Ko Kya Naam Doon?, Satya Nayak in Do Dil Ek Jaan and Jagan Pawaniya in Waaris.

Early life
Akshay was born and brought up in New Delhi with his younger sister, fellow actress Ridhi Dogra. Akshay was 21 before he decided to enter the entertainment business.

Career

Beginning
At age 21, Akshay decided to move to Mumbai, Maharashtra to pursue a career in the entertainment business. Starting in 2002, Akshay started working behind the scenes as Executive producer as well as a member of the Creative Unit of many shows. For a while after moving to Mumbai, Akshay worked as an assistant to Deepak Tijori. He eventually moved on to acting.

Breakthrough
After transitioning from behind the camera to acting, Akshay landed a role in Zee TV's 12/24 Karol Bagh. He also acted in Kiss Kiss Bang Bang (2008) on Bindass, alongside Shweta Gulati. He played the role of Vishal from 2009 to 2010. His character was of a NRI boy who becomes engaged to Milli (Hunar Halli). Although he was not a lead and this show didn't make him a household name, it did earn him enough success to help him land his next role. He, after his role on 12/24 Karol Bagh ended, landed the role of Akash Singh Raizada in the very popular Hindi Daily Soap Opera Iss Pyaar Ko Kya Naam Doon? on STAR Plus. His character is the cousin of the male lead Arnav (Barun Sobti), who also falls in love and marries the sister, Payal (Deepali Pansare) of the female lead Khushi (Sanaya Irani). His role on this show has made him much more popular and has opened up many new pathways for him.

In 2011, he also acted in stage play, Apples and Walnut, about valley of Kashmir.

However, in October 2012, he quit the show due to lack of importance given to his character.

Personal life
Akshay is married to Sakshi Dogra. They dated for six years before marrying. They have a son born on 29 February 2016 His sister Ridhi Dogra is a television actress who played the  lead role in show Maryada: Lekin Kab Tak?. He is the nephew of former senior Bhartiya Janata Party politician Arun Jaitley.

Television

Web series

References

External links

1981 births
Living people
Indian male television actors
Indian male soap opera actors
People from Delhi
Male actors from Delhi